Sebastian Skube (born 3 April 1987) is a Slovenian professional handball player who plays for Chambéry SMBH. He represented Slovenia at the 2013 World Men's Handball Championship. He is the older brother of Staš Skube.

References

1987 births
Living people
Sportspeople from Novo Mesto
Slovenian male handball players
Expatriate handball players
Slovenian expatriate sportspeople in Denmark
Slovenian expatriate sportspeople in France
21st-century Slovenian people